Some toilet roll holders or dispensers allow the toilet paper to hang in front of (over) or behind (under) the roll when it is placed parallel to the wall. This divides opinions about which orientation is better. Arguments range from aesthetics, hospitality, ease of access, and cleanliness to paper conservation, ease of detaching sheets, and compatibility with pets.

The US advice column Ask Ann Landers reported that the subject was the most controversial issue in the column's history and, at 15,000 letters in 1986, provoked the highest number of responses.

The case study of "toilet paper orientation" has been used as a teaching tool in instructing sociology students in the practice of social constructionism.

Arguments

The main reasons given by people to explain why they hang their toilet paper a given way are ease of grabbing and habit. 

The over position reduces the risk of accidentally brushing the wall or cabinet with one's knuckles, potentially transferring grime and germs; makes it easier to visually locate and to grasp the loose end; gives the option to fold over the last sheet to show that the room has been cleaned; and is generally the intended direction of viewing for the manufacturer's branding, so patterned toilet paper looks better this way.

The under position provides a tidier appearance, in that the loose end can be more hidden from view; reduces the risk of a toddler or a house pet such as a cat unrolling the toilet paper when batting at the roll; and in a recreational vehicle may reduce unrolling during driving.

Partisans have claimed that each method makes it easier to tear the toilet paper on a perforated sheet boundary.

The over position is shown in illustrations with the first patents for a free-hanging toilet-roll holders, issued in 1891. 

Various toilet paper dispensers are available which avoid the question of over or under orientation; for example, single sheet dispensers, jumbo roll dispensers in which the toilet roll is perpendicular to the wall, and twin roll dispensers. Swivelling toilet paper dispensers have been developed which allow the paper to be unrolled in either direction.

Public opinion 
In various surveys, around 70% of people prefer the over position. In a survey of 1,000 Americans, Cottonelle found that "overs" are more likely than "unders" to notice a roll's direction (74 percent), to be annoyed when the direction is "incorrect" (24 percent), and to have flipped the direction at a friend's home (27 percent). According to W. C. Privy's Original Bathroom Companion, Number 2, "By more than 4 to 1, older folks prefer to have their toilet paper dispense over the front." The same claim is made by James Buckley's The Bathroom Companion for people older than 50. Toilet paper orientation is sometimes mentioned as a hurdle for married couples. The issue may also arise in businesses and public places. At the Amundsen–Scott Research Station at the South Pole, complaints have been raised over which way to install toilet paper. It is unclear if one orientation is more economical than the other. The Centralian Advocate attributes a claim to Planet Green that over saves on paper usage.

Uses in social studies

The case study of "toilet paper orientation" is an important teaching tool in instructing sociology students in the practice of social constructionism.

In the article "Bathroom Politics: Introducing Students to Sociological Thinking from the Bottom Up", Eastern Institute of Technology sociology professor Edgar Alan Burns describes some reasons toilet paper politics is worthy of examination. On the first day of Burns' introductory course in sociology, he asks his students, "Which way do you think a roll of toilet paper should hang?" In the following fifty minutes, the students examine why they picked their answers, exploring the social construction of "rules and practices which they have never consciously thought about before". Burns' activity has been adopted by a social psychology course at the University of Notre Dame, where it is used to illustrate the principles of Berger and Luckmann's 1966 classic The Social Construction of Reality.

Christopher Peterson, a professor of psychology at the University of Michigan, classifies the choice of toilet paper orientation under "tastes, preferences, and interests" as opposed to either values or "attitudes, traits, norms, and needs". Other personal interests include one's favorite cola or baseball team. Interests are an important part of identity; one expects and prefers that different people have different interests, which serves one's "sense of uniqueness". Differences in interests usually lead at most to teasing and gentle chiding. For most people, interests do not cause the serious divisions caused by conflicts of values; a possible exception is what Peterson calls "the 'get a life' folks among us" who elevate interests into moral issues.

Morton Ann Gernsbacher, a professor of psychology at the University of Wisconsin–Madison, compares the orientation of toilet paper to the orientation of cutlery in a dishwasher, the choice of which drawer in a chest of drawers to place one's socks, and the order of shampooing one's hair and lathering one's body in the shower. In each choice, there is a prototypical solution chosen by the majority, and it is tempting to offer simplistic explanations of how the minority must be different. She warns that neuroimaging experiments—which as of 2007 were beginning to probe behaviors from mental rotation and facial expressions to grocery shopping and tickling—must strive to avoid such cultural bias and stereotypes.

In his book Conversational Capital, Bertrand Cesvet gives toilet paper placement as an example of ritualized behavior—one of the ways designers and marketers can create a memorable experience around a product that leads to word-of-mouth momentum. Cesvet's other examples include shaking a box of Tic Tacs and dissecting Oreo cookies.

References

Bibliography

Further reading
 
 
 
 
 
 
 
 
 
 
 
 
 
 
 
 
 
 
 
 
 
 
 

Toilet paper
Orientation (geometry)
Interpersonal conflict
Surveys (human research)